CRUZ del Sol Tequila is a brand of tequila produced in the highlands of Jalisco, Mexico by Los Diablos International, Inc.  The company currently offers two varieties of tequila, a blanco and a reposado.

History
Cruz Tequila was founded in May 2005 by partners and Arizona State University alumni Joseph and Saulo Katcher and Todd Nelson, and is headquartered in Scottsdale, Arizona. Cruz Tequila has since won numerous international spirit awards and is currently distributed in North America by Trinchero Family Estates and their partners in dozens of states and by nationwide online retailers.

Awards
Gold Medal, Reposado Tequila
2009 San Francisco International Spirits Competition

Silver Medal, Reposado Tequila
2008 San Francisco International Spirits Competition

Bronze Medal, Packaging Design
2008 San Francisco International Spirits Competition

Bronze Medal, Reposado Tequila
2008 Agave Spirits Competition

References
 San Francisco International Spirits Competition 2009
 San Francisco International Spirits Competition 2008
 Agave Spirits Challenge 2008
 Feature in June 2008 issue of Phoenix Business Journal
 Feature in July 2008 issue of The Phoenix Republic
 Review in November 2008 issue of Phoenix Magazine

External links
Cruz Tequila
Tequila.net Product Review

Tequila